The Monte Carlo View, also known as the Teotista, is a residential high-rise building in Monaco. 

The building was developed by the Michel Pastor Group. Construction began in 2008, and it was completed in 2012. It is 63.92 metres high, with 20 stories, and six underground floors. There is also a swimming-pool on the rooftop. It was designed in the postmodern style by French architect Jean-Michel Wilmotte.

References

Residential skyscrapers in Monaco
Residential buildings completed in 2012
Postmodern architecture in Monaco
Pastor family